Black Jack is a 1979 period children’s adventure film, directed by Ken Loach and based on the Leon Garfield novel. It is set in Yorkshire in 1750 and follows a young boy, Tolly (Stephen Hirst) and his adventures with a large French man (Jean Franval), the Black Jack of the title, and Belle a young English girl (Louise Cooper). It was awarded the Critics’ Award at the Cannes Film Festival (1979).

Cast
Stephen Hirst as Tolly
Louise Cooper as Belle
Jean Franval as Black Jack
Packie Manus Byrne as Dr. Carmody
Andrew Bennett as Hatch
John Young as Dr. Hunter
William Moore as Mr. Carter
Doreen Mantle as Mrs. Carter
Russell Waters as Dr. Jones
Malcolm Dixon as Tom Thumb's Army
Mike Edmonds as Tom Thumb's Army
David Rappaport as Tom Thumb's Army
Tiny Ross as Tom Thumb's Army

Production
Black Jack was the first film investment by Goldcrest Pictures, who provided £11,250 for initial development. Goldcrest recouped this when the film went into production. The bulk of financing came from the National Film Finance Corporation.

Reception
Black Jack won the FIPRESCI Award at the 1979 Cannes Film Festival. The film was also nominated for the "Gold Hugo" at the 1979 Chicago International Film Festival.

References

Notes

External links

1970s adventure comedy films
1979 films
British adventure comedy films
Films set in 1750
Films set in Yorkshire
1979 comedy films
1970s English-language films
1970s British films